The 2014 FIFA World Cup CONCACAF–OFC qualification play-off was a two-legged home-and-away tie between the winners of the Oceania qualifying tournament, New Zealand, and the fourth-placed team from the North and Central American and Caribbean qualifying tournament, Mexico.

It was the second consecutive FIFA World Cup play-off that New Zealand has played in; New Zealand won 1–0 on aggregate over Bahrain in its previous play-off. The draw for the order in which the two matches would be played was held on 30 July 2011 during the FIFA at the World Cup Preliminary Draw.

The games were played on 13 November in Mexico City and 20 November 2013 in Wellington. In the first leg at Estadio Azteca, Mexico easily defeated New Zealand 5–1. The Mexican side achieved another win over New Zealand in the second leg at Westpac Stadium with a score of 4–2. As a result, Mexico won 9–3 on aggregate to qualify for the World Cup in Brazil.

Venues

Match details

First leg 

|valign="top"|
|valign="top" width="50%"|

|}

Second leg 

|valign="top"|
|valign="top" width="50%"|

|}

Television broadcast
 Mexico - Azteca 7, Canal 5, TDN
 New Zealand - Sky Sport 
 United Kingdom & Ireland - Premier Sports
 United States - ESPN (English), UniMás/Univision Deportes (Spanish)

References

Play-Off
5
4
New Zealand national football team matches
Mexico national football team matches
FIFA World Cup qualification inter-confederation play-offs
November 2013 sports events in Mexico
November 2013 sports events in New Zealand
2010s in Mexico City
Sports competitions in Mexico City
Sports competitions in Wellington
2010s in Wellington
International association football competitions hosted by Mexico
International association football competitions hosted by New Zealand
2013–14 in New Zealand association football
qualification 3